Basasteron is a monotypic genus of spiders in the family Zodariidae. It was first described by Baehr in 2003. , it contains only one species, Basasteron leucosemum, from Lord Howe Island.

References

Zodariidae
Monotypic Araneomorphae genera
Spiders of Australia